Labor Day is a federal holiday in the United States celebrated on the first Monday in September to honor and recognize the American labor movement and the works and contributions of laborers to the development and achievements of the United States. The three-day weekend it falls on is called Labor Day Weekend.

Beginning in the late 19th century, as the trade union and labor movements grew, trade unionists proposed that a day be set aside to celebrate labor. "Labor Day" was promoted by the Central Labor Union and the Knights of Labor, which organized the first parade in New York City. In 1887, Oregon was the first state of the United States to make it an official public holiday. By the time it became an official federal holiday in 1894, thirty states in the U.S. officially celebrated Labor Day.

Canada's Labour Day is also celebrated on the first Monday of September. More than 80 other countries celebrate International Workers' Day on May 1, the ancient European holiday of May Day. May Day was chosen by the Second International of socialist and communist parties to commemorate the general  labor strike and events leading to the Haymarket affair, which occurred in Chicago May 1 – May 4, 1886.

History

Origin

Beginning in the late 19th century, as the trade union and labor movements grew, diverse groups of trade unionists chose a variety of days on which to celebrate labor. In the United States, a September holiday called Labor Day was first proposed in the early 1880s.

Alternative accounts of the event's origin exist. Descendants of two men with similar last names claim their great-grandfather was the true father of the holiday.

According to one early history of Labor Day, the event originated in connection with a General Assembly of the Knights of Labor convened in New York City in September 1882. In connection with this clandestine Knights assembly, a public parade of various labor organizations was held on September 5 under the auspices of the Central Labor Union (CLU) of New York. Secretary of the CLU Matthew Maguire is credited for first proposing that a national Labor Day holiday subsequently be held on the first Monday of each September in the aftermath of this successful public demonstration.

An alternative theory maintains that the idea of Labor Day was the brainchild of Peter J. McGuire, a vice president of the American Federation of Labor, who, after a visit to Toronto where he saw parades celebrating labor that May, had put forward the initial proposal in the spring of 1882. According to McGuire, on May 8, 1882, he made a proposition to the fledgling Central Labor Union in New York City that a day be set aside for a "general holiday for the laboring classes". According to McGuire he further recommended that the event should begin with a street parade as a public demonstration of organized labor's solidarity and strength, with the march followed by a picnic, to which participating local unions could sell tickets as a fundraiser. According to McGuire he suggested the first Monday in September as an ideal date for such a public celebration, owing to optimum weather and the date's place on the calendar, sitting midway between the Fourth of July and Thanksgiving public holidays.

Labor Day picnics and other public gatherings frequently featured speeches by prominent labor leaders.

In 1909, the American Federation of Labor convention designated the Sunday preceding Labor Day as "Labor Sunday", to be dedicated to the spiritual and educational aspects of the labor movement. This secondary date failed to gain significant traction in popular culture, although some churches continue to acknowledge it.

Legal recognition
The popularity of the event spread across the country. In 1887, Oregon became the first state of the United States to make Labor Day an official public holiday. By 1894, thirty U.S. states were already officially celebrating Labor Day. In that year, Congress passed a bill recognizing the first Monday of September as Labor Day and making it an official federal holiday. President Grover Cleveland signed the bill into law on June 28. The federal law, however, only made it a holiday for federal workers. As late as the 1930s, unions were encouraging workers to strike to make sure they got the day off. All U.S. states, the District of Columbia, and the United States territories have subsequently made Labor Day a statutory holiday. Labor Day became a federal holiday shortly after the Pullman Strike.

Labor Day versus May Day

The date of May 1 (an ancient European folk holiday known as May Day) emerged in 1886 as an alternative holiday for the celebration of labor, later becoming known as International Workers' Day. The date had its origins at the 1885 convention of the American Federation of Labor, which passed a resolution calling for adoption of the eight-hour day effective May 1, 1886. While negotiation was envisioned for achievement of the shortened work day, use of the strike to enforce this demand was recognized, with May 1 advocated as a date for coordinated strike action. The proximity of the date to the bloody Haymarket affair of May 4, 1886, further accentuated May First's radical reputation.

There was disagreement among labor unions at this time about when a holiday celebrating workers should be, with some advocating for continued emphasis of the September march-and-picnic date while others sought the designation of the more politically charged date of May 1. Conservative Democratic President Grover Cleveland was one of those concerned that a labor holiday on May 1 would tend to become a commemoration of the Haymarket affair and would strengthen socialist and anarchist movements that backed the May 1 commemoration around the globe. In 1887, he publicly supported the September Labor Day holiday as a less inflammatory alternative, formally adopting the date as a United States federal holiday through a law that he signed in 1894.

Since the mid-1950s, the United States has celebrated Loyalty Day and Law Day on May 1. Unlike Labor Day, neither are legal public holidays (in that government agencies and most businesses do not shut down to celebrate them) and therefore have remained relatively obscure. Loyalty Day is formally celebrated in a few cities, while some bar associations hold Law Day events to celebrate the rule of law.

Unofficial end of summer
Labor Day is called the "unofficial end of summer" because it marks the end of the cultural summer season. Many take their two-week vacations during the two weeks ending Labor Day weekend. Many fall activities, such as school and sports (particularly football), begin about this time.

In the United States, many school districts resume classes around the Labor Day holiday weekend (see First day of school). Some begin the week before, making Labor Day weekend the first three-day weekend of the school calendar, while others return the Tuesday following Labor Day. Many districts across the Midwest are opting to begin school after Labor Day.

In the U.S. state of Virginia, the amusement park industry has successfully lobbied for legislation requiring most school districts in the state to have their first day of school after Labor Day, in order to give families another weekend to visit amusement parks in the state. The relevant statute has been nicknamed the "Kings Dominion law" after one such park. This law was repealed in 2019.

In the U.S. state of Minnesota, the State Fair ends on Labor Day. Under state law, public schools normally do not begin until after the holiday. One reason given for this timing was to allow time for schoolchildren to show 4-H projects at the Fair.

In U.S. sports, Labor Day weekend marks the beginning of many fall sports. National Collegiate Athletic Association (NCAA) teams usually play their first games that weekend, and the National Football League (NFL) traditionally play their kickoff game the Thursday following Labor Day. The Southern 500 NASCAR auto race has been held on Labor Day weekend at Darlington Raceway in Darlington, South Carolina from 1950 to 2003 and since 2015. At Indianapolis Raceway Park, the National Hot Rod Association hold their finals of the NHRA U.S. Nationals drag race that weekend. Labor Day is the middle point between weeks one and two of the U.S. Open Tennis Championships held in Flushing Meadows, New York.

In fashion, Labor Day is (or was) considered the last day when it is acceptable to wear white or seersucker.

There are numerous events and activities organized in major cities. For example, New York offers the Labor Day Carnival, and fireworks over Coney Island. In Washington, one popular event is the Labor Day Concert at the U.S. Capitol featuring the National Symphony Orchestra with free attendance.

Labor Day sales
To take advantage of large numbers of potential customers with time to shop, Labor Day has become an important weekend for discounts and allowances by many retailers in the United States, especially for back-to-school sales. Some retailers claim it is one of the largest sale dates of the year, second only to the Christmas season's Black Friday.

See also
 Labor unions in the United States
 United States labor law
 Workers' Memorial Day

Citations

General and cited references

External links

 History of Labor Day, History of Artists and Writers Unions, Rare Labor Related Comic Books
 "Labor Day is May 1: Today is a boss's holiday". Jacobin. September 7, 2015.
 "Today Belongs to Workers". Jacobin. September 5, 2016.
 

1882 establishments in the United States
Articles containing video clips
Federal holidays in the United States
Holidays and observances by scheduling (nth weekday of the month)
Day
Labour days
Monday observances
Public holidays in the United States
Recurring events established in 1882
September observances
Summer events in the United States
United States flag flying days